|}
{| class="collapsible collapsed" cellpadding="0" cellspacing="0" style="clear:right; float:right; text-align:center; font-weight:bold;" width="280px"
! colspan="3" style="border:1px solid black; background-color: #77DD77;" | Also Ran

The 2020 Epsom Derby was the 241st annual running of the Derby horse race and took place at Epsom Downs Racecourse on 4 July 2020. The race was sponsored by Investec. It was originally scheduled to take place at on 6 June 2020, but was postponed until later in the season due to the COVID-19 pandemic and eventually rescheduled to take place on 4 July 2020.

The winner was the Coolmore Stud's chestnut colt Serpentine, ridden by Emmet McNamara and trained at Ballydoyle in Ireland by Aidan O'Brien, who saddled a record eighth Derby winner. McNamara was riding in the Derby for the first time and registered his first win in any race since October 2019.

Race synopsis

Entries and race build-up 
The initial entry for the 2020 Epsom Derby, announced in December 2018, consisted of 356 yearlings whose owners paid for each horse entered. The number of entries was an increase of 18 on the initial entry for the 2019 race, and included 12 horses from the Godolphin organisation and 75 from the Coolmore Stud. Khalid Abdullah entered 16 horses and five-time winning owner Aga Khan IV had 19 entries. Queen Elizabeth II entered 5 horses for the race.

Two wild card entries were planned, one for winning the Investec Derby "Wild Card" Conditions Race in September 2019 and the other for winning the 2020 Blue Riband Trial Stakes. Grand Rock, trained by William Haggas won the September 2019 race to claim the first wild card entry. The 2020 running of the Blue Riband Trial Stakes was cancelled because of the COVID-19 pandemic in the United Kingdom

The COVID outbreak lead to the Derby being postponed to 4 July 2020, although the course and distance remained unchanged. The restrictions imposed owing to the pandemic meant that many of the traditional trial races for the Derby were either cancelled or rearranged. For example, the Dante Stakes, usually a major trial, was postponed to July and run after the Derby, whereas the King Edward VII Stakes which is usually run after the Derby became a trial race for the Epsom classic. A further consideration for the rescheduled meeting was the need to run the race without spectators ("behind closed doors"). The course can be accessed by a number of public footpaths and bridleways and in order to hold the meeting behind closed doors at Epsom the local council had to approve an application for public access to be restricted. The original entries for the race were cancelled on 8 April 2020 with entry fees being refunded. The race attracted a total of seventeen entries when it was reopened on 28 June 2020. Of these seventeen, sixteen were declared on 2 July 2020, with the exception being the Aidan O'Brien-trained Armory.

Race card 

 Trainers are based in Great Britain unless indicated.

Full result

Winning time: 2 min 34.43 sec

* The distances between the horses are shown in lengths or shorter; nse = nose; hd = head.† Trainers are based in Great Britain unless indicated.

Form analysis

Two-year-old races 
Notable runs by the future Derby participants as two-year-olds in 2019
 Gold Maze – 2nd in Beresford Stakes
 Highland Chief – 3rd in Chesham Stakes
 Kameko – 1st in Vertem Futurity Trophy, 2nd in Royal Lodge Stakes, 2nd in Solario Stakes
 Max Vega – 1st in Zetland Stakes
 Mogul – 1st in Juvenile Stakes
 Mohican Heights – 1st in Stonehenge Stakes
 Mythical – 3rd in Critérium de Saint-Cloud
 Pyledriver – 1st in Ascendant Stakes

Road to Epsom 
Early-season appearances in 2020 and trial races prior to running in the Derby:
 Emissary – 2nd in Cocked Hat Stakes
 English King – 1st in Lingfield Derby Trial
 Gold Maze – 2nd in Gallinule Stakes
 Kameko – 1st in 2000 Guineas
 Khalifa Sat – 1st in Cocked Hat Stakes
 Mohican Heights – 3rd in King Edward VII Stakes
 Pyledriver – 1st in King Edward VII Stakes, 2nd in Sandown Classic Trial
 Russian Emperor – 1st in Hampton Court Stakes, 2nd in Derrinstown Stud Derby Trial
 Vatican City – 2nd in Irish 2000 Guineas

Subsequent Group 1 wins
Group 1 / Grade I victories after running in the Derby:
 Mogul – Grand Prix de Paris (2020), Hong Kong Vase (2020)
 Pyledriver – Coronation Cup (2021), King George VI and Queen Elizabeth Stakes (2022)
 Russian Emperor – Hong Kong Gold Cup (2022)

See also

2020 British Champions Series

References

2020 in horse racing
2020 in English sport
 2020
2020 Epsom Derby
July 2020 sports events in the United Kingdom
Sports events postponed due to the COVID-19 pandemic